The Golf Premier League was a franchise-based golf tournament held in Aamby Valley, India in 2013. Each franchise consisted of four golfers: one international golfer, one Indian golfer, one from one Asian tour and one from golf tour of India. Players were purchased through auctions consisting of 32 international golfers. The league was played from 7 February to 10 February 2013 and also brought the practice of daytime and nighttime golf play.

Uttarakhand Lions, led by Ryder Cup player Darren Clarke, were the winners of the tournament.

Franchises
The following eight teams took part.

 Colombo Sixes
 Delhi Darts
 Gujarat Underdawgs
 Maharashtra 59ers
 Punjab Lancers
 Uttar Pradesh Eagles
 Tamil Nadu Pullees
 Uttarakhand Lions

References

External links
 Official site

Golf tournaments in India